Nannodiella vespuciana, common name Vespucci's dwarf turrid, is a species of sea snail, a marine gastropod mollusk in the family Clathurellidae.

Description
The shell grows to a length of 6 mm. The shell is whitish. The whorls are clathrate, slightly, narrowly shouldered.

Distribution
This marine species occurs in the Caribbean Sea, the Gulf of Mexico and along Puerto Rico; along the Mid-Atlantic Ridge.

References

 Rosenberg, G., F. Moretzsohn, and E. F. García. 2009. Gastropoda (Mollusca) of the Gulf of Mexico, pp. 579–699 in Felder, D.L. and D.K. Camp (eds.), Gulf of Mexico–Origins, Waters, and Biota. Biodiversity. Texas A&M Press, College Station, Texas

External links
 

vespuciana
Gastropods described in 1842